Phyllophryne scortea, the smooth anglerfish, is a species of frogfish endemic to the waters around Australia.  This species grows to a length of  TL.  This species is the only known member of its genus.

References
 

Antennariidae
Monotypic fish genera
Taxa named by Allan Riverstone McCulloch
Taxa named by Edgar Ravenswood Waite
Fish described in 1918